The Hawaii County Band is a municipal band founded in 1883. It is the second oldest professional musical organization in the State of Hawaii. Only the Royal Hawaiian Band, founded in 1836, is older.

The Hawaii County Band, based in Hilo, is composed of approximately 40 part-time musicians and a full-time director and is part of the Parks and Recreation Department of the County of Hawaii. The band performs for free at ceremonies, festivals, parades, dedications and many other public events throughout Hawaii Island (variously nicknamed "The Orchid Island," "The Volcano Island, and "The Big Island"). The band performs a monthly concert at Mooheau Park in downtown Hilo.

The West Hawaii County Band, based in Kailua-Kona on the Kona Coast of Hawaii Island, is an independent sub-unit of the Hawai'i County Band. As a civic band The West Hawaii County Band can be heard at regular monthly concerts in Kailua-Kona as well as performing in numerous parades and civic events on the west side of Hawaii Island.

History
The Hawaii County Band was founded in 1883 by two brothers from Portugal, Joaquin and Jules Carvalho. They emigrated from the Azores and made a living as barbers in Hilo, on the island of Hawaii. The brothers would close their barbershop, perform at scheduled concerts and go back to cutting hair afterwards. Joaquin was the conductor and Jules played the cornet.

The band survived the overthrow of the Kingdom of Hawaii in 1893 and the period of the Republic of Hawaii (1894–1898). It was absorbed by the newly created County of Hawaii during the territorial period (1898–1959). It was known as the Hilo Band (or the Hilo Portuguese Band). After the creation of the county system in the Territory of Hawaii  in 1900 it officially became the Hawaii County Band in 1905.

After Joaquin died in 1924, the band had several directors. Urban Carvalho, son of co-founder Jules Carvalho, led the band from 1943 to 1963. Frank Vierra went on to become the director of the Royal Hawaiian Band.

Directors

Hawaii County Band (Hilo), 
There have been 12 directors of the band:

 Joaquin Carvalho (1883–1924)
 Paul Tallett (1924–1925)
 Frank Vierra (1925–1933)
 Frank Wrigley (1933–1938)
 Gabriel Wela (1938–1943)
 Urban Carvalho (1943–1963)
 Andres Baclig (1963–1974)
 Armando Mendoza (1974–1981 / 1983–1984)
 John Hursey (1981–1983)
 David Lorch (1984–1993)
 Wayne Kawakami (1993–2001)
 Paul Arceo (2001–present)

The West Hawaii County Band (Kailua-Kona) 
David Lorch
Gary Ventimiglia 
Lisa Archuletta
Charlie Peebles
Lisa Archuletta
Bernaldo Evangelista
Lisa Archuleta
Bernaldo Evangalista 
Richard Shields, guest conductor (current as of January, 2022)

Today
Unlike the Royal Hawaiian Band, the Hawaii County Bands are not full-time bands. Except for the band director, the musicians in the Hawaii County bands are employed by County of Hawaii Department of Parks and Recreation on a part-time basis. Some members have been with the band for many years. One exceptional trombonist in his eighties has been with the band continuously for over 60 years. The West Hawaii County Band also includes a number of volunteer musicians including retired professional musicians, music teachers and others from all walks of life.

Uniforms

Hawaii County Band 
The uniform for the Hawaii County Band is a red and white aloha shirt. Cross-striped fabric patterns, similar to those of Scottish kilts, were imported from England in the late 19th century as uniforms for the workers on the sugarcane plantations in Hawaii and are still popular apparel among the locals in Hawaii.

West Hawaii County Band 
The uniform for the West Hawaii County Band is currently (June 2019) a blue patterned aloha shirt and white pants. When the band performs as the Hulihee Palace Band the uniform changes to a white aloha shirt with red sash.

Performances

Hawaii County Band 
Monthly concerts are at the Mooheau Park bandstand in downtown Hilo, usually on the second Saturday of each month at noon. The Mooheau Park Bandstand is a historic structure dating back to 1904, though some accounts claim the bandstand is even older, making it the performing home of the band for at least 106 years. It is also the center for cultural events, political rallies and other downtown Hilo events.

West Hawaii County Band 
Monthly concerts are generally the 3rd Friday of each month and take place at Hale Halawai County Park on Alii Drive in Kailua-Kona. In addition the band can be heard at numerous civic events including Memorial and Veteran's Day at the West Hawaii Veterans Cemetery and local parades including The Fourth of July and Christmas parades in Kailua-Kona.

Current Events
In February 2010, the Hawaii County Mayor Billy Kenoi announced he was eliminating the Hawaii County Band to help balance the county budget. If the proposed budget is accepted by the Hawaii County Council, it will effectively put an end to the Hawaii County Band as an organization.
 , The Hawai'i County Bands are included in the county budget.

References

External links
 County of Hawai`i Website
 West Hawai'i County Band Website (sponsored by the West Hawai'i County Band Friends)

Hawaii (island)
Musical groups from Hawaii
Wind bands
1883 establishments in Hawaii
Musical groups established in 1883